Canepa may refer to:

People
 Adolfo Canepa (born 1940), Gibraltarian politician
 Bruce Canepa, American race car driver
 Carlos Cánepa, Peruvian politician
 Cesare Canepa, Swiss curler
 Diego Cánepa (canoeist) (born 1976), Belgian sprint canoeist
 Diego Cánepa (politician) (born 1972), Uruguayan lawyer and politician
 Niccolò Canepa (born 1988), Italian motorcycle road racer

Places
 Canepa, San Marino, a village

Plants
Melicoccus bijugatus, a fruit-bearing tree